Little Derek was the second single to be released by UK hip hop artist Sway DaSafo from his debut album This Is My Demo. Released on 16 January 2006 on 12" and 7" vinyl and CD, it featured the British rapper Baby Blue. The single charted at #38.

Track listings

CD single
 "Little Derek (Edit)"
 "Little Derek" featuring Baby Blue
 "Little Derek (Instrumental)"
 "Download"
 "Download (Video)"
 "Little Derek (Video)"

12-inch single
A-side
 "Little Derek (Full Version)" featuring Baby Blue
 "Little Derek (Instrumental)"

B-side
 "Download (LP Version)"
 "Download (Acapella)"

7-inch single
A-side
 "Little Derek (Full Version)" featuring Baby Blue

B-side
 "Pretty Ugly Husband" featuring Latoya

References

2005 songs
2006 singles
Sway (musician) songs
Song recordings produced by Al Shux
Songs written by Al Shux
Songs written by Sway (musician)